2-(1,2-epoxy-1,2-dihydrophenyl)acetyl-CoA isomerase (paaG (gene), 1,2-epoxyphenylacetyl-CoA isomerase) is an enzyme with systematic name 2-(1,2-epoxy-1,2-dihydrophenyl)acetyl-CoA isomerase. This enzyme catalyses the following chemical reaction

 2-(1,2-epoxy-1,2-dihydrophenyl)acetyl-CoA  2-oxepin-2(3H)-ylideneacetyl-CoA

The enzyme catalyses the reversible isomerization of 2-(1,2-epoxy-1,2-dihydrophenyl)acetyl-CoA.

References

External links 
 

EC 5.3.3